Lombardi, Ltd. (also sometimes styled Lombardi Limited in publicity materials) is a surviving 1919 American silent feature comedy film. It was adapted by June Mathis from a 1917 play of the same name by Frederick and Fanny Hatton, and directed by Jack Conway.  Warner Baxter had an early uncredited minor role in the film.

Plot
Tito Lombardi's struggling Fifth Avenue couture house is spiraling into financial failure. Through a Broadway investor he meets and falls for a showgirl who soon proves to be a gold-digger; his attractive but unassuming female assistant Norah loves him but has never made her feelings known. With money from a third-party inheritance and some ingenuity on Norah's part, the House of Lombardi is resurrected. Lombardi and Norah find true love together.

Cast
 Bert Lytell as Tito Lambardi
 Alice Lake as Norah Blake
 Vera Lewis as Mollie
 Juanita Hansen as Phyllis Manning
 George A. McDaniel as Riccardo 'Ricky' Tosello
 Joseph Kilgour as Bob Tarrant
 Thomas Jefferson as James Hodkins
 Thea Talbot as Eloise
 Ann May as 
 John Steppling as Max Strohan
 Jean Acker as Daisy
 Virginia Caldwell as Yvette
 Golda Madden as Clothilde
 Miss DuPont as Muriel (credited as Patricia Hannan)

Preservation status
A print of Lombardi, Ltd. was donated by the MGM and is preserved at the George Eastman House.

References

External links

1919 films
1919 comedy films
American black-and-white films
American silent feature films
Films directed by Jack Conway
Films about fashion
Films set in New York City
Films set in California
Silent American comedy films
Metro Pictures films
1910s American films